Celebration is a triptych painting by Tyeb Mehta. It sold at Christie's for 15 million Indian rupees (US$300,000) in 2002, the highest price a contemporary Indian piece of art has ever sold for in a public auction.

References 

Indian paintings
Triptychs